The Fundacion Comunitaria Televisora de Petare (TV Petare), is a Venezuelan television station that was created in July 2002.  Its specific objective is to serve the people living in the municipality of Sucre in the Miranda State.

This television station is made up of a diverse group of people living in different areas throughout the Caracas neighborhood of Petare.

See also
List of Venezuelan television channels

External links
Official Site

Television stations in Venezuela
Television channels and stations established in 2002
2002 establishments in Venezuela